The Mystery of Time is the sixth full-length album by German Tobias Sammet's rock opera project Avantasia. The album was released on 26 April 2013. This is the first Avantasia release to feature the German Film Orchestra Babelsberg (the same orchestra that performed on Edguy's album Hellfire Club). The cover artwork was painted by Rodney Matthews.

The Mystery Of Time scored high positions in several international music charts and even enabled Avantasia to enter the US Billboard charts for the first time.

When asked to compare the album to Avantasia's previous efforts, guitarist and producer Sascha Paeth described it as follows:

Track listing
Limited editions of the album include a second CD with instrumental versions of all the tracks on the album, with the exception of the two limited edition bonus tracks.

Story
The album booklet describes the story "So take the time to follow me into a small old English town during the Victorian era and join a young agnostic scientist by the name Aaron Blackwell as he is forced to explore the coherencies of time, God and science; torn between belief in his professional conviction, his spiritual intuition, love and a lodge of scientific occultists."

Personnel
 Tobias Sammet - lead vocals, bass
 Sascha Paeth - lead & rhythm guitars, guitar solos on #01, 04-09; additional bass; additional keyboards
 Miro - keyboards, piano
 Russell Gilbrook - drums

Special guests

Musicians
Guitars
Bruce Kulick - solo on #03, 06, 10
Oliver Hartmann - solo on #04, 07
Arjen Anthony Lucassen - solo on #02
Organ
Ferdy Doernberg - hammond organ solo on #02

Vocalists
 Joe Lynn Turner (ex-Rainbow, ex-Yngwie Malmsteen ex-Deep Purple) - co-lead vocals on #01, 02, 06, 10
 Michael Kiske (Helloween, Place Vendome, Unisonic) - co-lead vocals on #04, 06, 09
 Biff Byford (Saxon) - co-lead vocals on #03, 06, 10
 Ronnie Atkins (Pretty Maids) - co-lead vocals on #07
 Eric Martin (Mr. Big) - co-lead vocals on #08
 Bob Catley (Magnum) - co-lead vocals on #10
 Cloudy Yang - co-lead vocals on #05

Charts

References

External links
Tobias Sammet's official (Avantasia) website
The Mystery Of Time listening session review

Avantasia albums
2013 albums
Rock operas
Nuclear Blast albums
Concept albums